Iron Mountain is one of the highest points in peninsular Florida, United States and a prominent point of the Lake Wales Ridge. The ridge is located just north of the city of Lake Wales. The tower of the famous tourist attraction Bok Tower Gardens is built on the summit.

See also
List of Florida's highest points

References
Citations

Bibliography

 
 

Hills of Florida
Landforms of Polk County, Florida